Love in Her Bag is a 2013 South Korean television series starring Choi Jung-won, Kim Jeong-hoon, Son Eun-seo, and Park Yoon-jae. It aired on JTBC from August 5 to October 8, 2013 on Mondays and Tuesdays at 20:45 (KST) time slot for 20 episodes.

Synopsis
Despite her poverty, home abuse from her aunt (who took her in following her mother's death), and lack of education or connections, bright and plucky Eun Jung-soo (Choi Jung-won) works her way up in the luxury handbag industry based on sheer talent alone. She encounters Do Jin-hoo (Kim Jeong-hoon), the smart and handsome chaebol heir of a fashion company, and Kim Seo-hyun (Son Eun-seo) who has to hide her true identity as Eun Kyung-hee, Jung-soo's cousin who, with her mother's help, usurped Jung-soo's place as the adopted daughter of a rich woman, in order to achieve her dreams.

Cast

Main
 Choi Jung-won as Eun Jung-soo
 Kim Bo-ra as teenage Jung-soo 
 Kim Soo-hyun as young Jung-soo
 Kim Jeong-hoon as Do Jin-hoo
 Yong Hong-bin as teenage Jin-hoo
 Son Eun-seo as Kim Seo-hyun / Eun Kyung-hee, Eun Jung-soo's cousin
 Park So-young as teenage Kyung-hee
 Shin Soo-yeon as young Kyung-hee
 Park Yoon-jae as Kang Min-ki

Supporting
 Choi Su-rin as Eun Hye-jung, Eun Jung-soo's mother
 Maeng Sang-hoon as Eun Ki-jung, Eun Jung-soo's uncle
 Jeon Soo-kyeong as Kim Mi-yeon, Eun Jung-soo's aunt
 Jang Tae-sung as Eun Kyung-ho
 Jung Yoon-seok as young Kyung-ho
 Byun Jung-hye as Yeo Sook-kyung
 Kim Sung-kyum as Do Kyung-chul
 Kim Byung-se as Kim Jong-wook
 Kim Hyeseon as Woo Do-young
 Jeon No-min as Choi Soo-ho
 Lee Yeon-kyung as Jang Yeon-sook
 Shim Eun-jin as Goo So-young
 Jin Ye-sol as Yoo Ah-ra
 Jin Sung as Jegal Yong-sam
 Na Hyun-joo as Go Eun-joo
 Yoon Chae-yi as Song Jin-kyung
 Kang Da-bin as Park Jong-min
 Lee Hee-do as Kim Dae-poong

References

External links
  
 
 

Korean-language television shows
2013 South Korean television series debuts
2013 South Korean television series endings
JTBC television dramas
South Korean romance television series
Television series by Logos Film